Agelanthus uhehensis is a species of hemiparasitic plant in the family Loranthaceae, which is native to Tanzania.

Description 
A description of the plant is given in Govaerts et al., based on Polhill & Wiens (1999).

Habitat/ecology
A. uhehensis commonly parasitises Bridelia on forest edges. It also parasitises Ficus.

Threats 
The major threat is habitat conversion to agriculture.  However it has been found in some tea estates where the forests are protected.

References

Flora of Tanzania
uhehensis